Benedetto Bacchini or Bernardino Bacchini (31 August 1651 – 1 September 1721) was an Italian monk and man of letters.

Biography 
Bacchini was born on 31 August 1651, at Borgo San Donnino, in the Duchy of Parma. He studied at the Jesuit institution, and entered the Order of St. Benedict in 1668, when he took the praenomen Bernardino. Prepared by his studies, he devoted his attention to preaching. Having become secretary of the abbot of St. Benedict of Ferrara, he accompanied him to Venice, Placentia, Parma, and Padua, and was known among the celebrated literati of the time. In 1683 he devoted himself entirely to the study of literature. In 1688 he became theologian of the duke of Parma, who desired to secure a man of such merit. In 1689 he introduced into the regulations of the Benedictine Order of St. Alexander of Parma certain modifications, which resulted in his being obliged to leave Parma. The duke of Modena appointed him in 1691 counsellor of the Inquisition. After some journeys in the interests of science, he refused the offers of cardinal Aguirre, who wished to retain him at Rome, and was appointed librarian of the duke. In 1704 he was made prior of his order at Modena. He received other ecclesiastical honors, and died at Ferrara on 1 September 1721.

Main works 
 Orazione nell'Esequie della Ser. Margherita de Medici, Duchessa di Parma (1670);
 De sistrorum Figuris ac Differentia… ob sistri romani effigiem communicatam, Dissertatio (Bologna, 1691);
 Anonymi Dialogi tres : de Constantia ; de Dignitate tuenda ; de Amore erga rempublicam (Modena, 1691);
 Istoria del Monastero di S. Benedetto di Polirone (Modena, 1696);
 De Ecclesiasticae Hierarchiae Originibus Dissertatio (Modena, 1703).

Bibliography 

 
 

17th-century Italian historians
Italian librarians
1651 births
1721 deaths
People from Fidenza
18th-century Italian historians